The Centre for the Book is a building situated next to the Company's Gardens in Cape Town. The building is run for the state by an independent organization of the same name, to promote literacy, reading, publishing and for conferences, symposia, training courses and exhibitions pertaining to these.

History
The building opened in 1913, and was originally built with money donated by Willem Hiddingh and Donald Currie and was to be the headquarters of the then University of the Cape of Good Hope, today known as the University of South Africa, as an examination centre for colleges such as Victoria College, Stellenbosch, South African College and others, who are today universities in their own right.

In 1932, University of South Africa moved to rented premises in Pretoria. The building was sold to the state, to be the home of the National Archives of South Africa, and an elevator and fire detection system was installed. 

In 1987, the building was offered to the South African Library, which planned to house some of its special collections there, as the Archives planned to relocate to new premises. In February 1990, the Archives moved to out and by this time the building was in a state of serious disrepair with crumbling stonework and major damage to the roofs. During this year the building was proclaimed a National Monument.

A leading restoration consultant, John Rennie, was appointed to tend to the building with a very limited budget. The elevator is a custom design, has unique finishes, and opens into three directions with three separate doors as necessitated by the design of the building.

Architecture
The building is built in the Edwardian style. Two British architects, W. Hawke and W.N. McKinlay, won a competition for its design and moved to South Africa to oversee its construction. The architects moved on to contribute to the design of the Union Buildings.

References 

Buildings and structures in Cape Town